Lepidochrysops chittyi, the Chitty's blue, is a butterfly in the family Lycaenidae. It is found in Zimbabwe. The habitat consists of flat grassland.

Adults are on wing from September to October.

References

Butterflies described in 1994
Lepidochrysops
Endemic fauna of Zimbabwe
Butterflies of Africa